Gary Demonte Chapman (born January 10, 1938) is an American author and radio talk show host. Chapman is most noted for his The Five Love Languages series regarding human relationships.

Biography
Chapman was born on January 10, 1938, in China Grove, North Carolina.

Chapman joined the staff of Calvary Baptist Church in Winston-Salem, North Carolina, in 1971 and shares the responsibilities of teaching and family care.

Chapman is perhaps best known for his concept of "Five Love Languages", helping people express and receive love as expressed through one of five languages: words of affirmation, quality time, receiving gifts, acts of service, or physical touch. Chapman argues that while each of these languages is enjoyed to some degree by all people, a person will usually speak one primary language, but all are important and can be ranked after taking the love language profile.  

The first of many books promoting the above concept was The Five Love Languages: How to Express Heartfelt Commitment to Your Mate, first published in 1992. The book has sold over 11 million copies in English; having been translated into 49 other languages and the 2015 edition consistently ranks in the top 100 sellers on Amazon.com, ranking in the top 50 as of February, 2007.  It also consistently ranks in the top five books on the New York Times bestsellers list, claiming the #1 spot at times.

He has also authored the Five Love Language concept books for parents of children and teenagers, single adults, and a special version for men. He has co-authored The Five Languages of Apology with Dr. Jennifer Thomas, which focuses on giving and receiving apologies.  Additionally, Chapman co-authored The 5 Languages of Appreciation in the Workplace with Dr. Paul White, applying the concepts to work-based relationships.
Chapman travels the world presenting seminars on marriage, family, and relationships, and his radio programs air on more than 400 stations. 

He is married to Karolyn J. Chapman. They have two adult children, Shelley and Derek.

Selected bibliography 

Gary Chapman, Jennifer Thomas (2006).  The Five Languages of Apology.  Moody.  
Gary Chapman (2009). The Marriage You've Always Wanted.  Paperback: 160 pages. Moody Publishers; 1 edition (July 22, 2009). .
Gary Chapman, Jennifer Thomas (2013). "When Sorry Isn't Enough". Northfield Press. 
Gary Chapman (2009). Love is a Verb: Stories of What Happens When Love Comes Alive Bethany House. 

Gary Chapman, Paul White (2011). The 5 Languages of Appreciation in the Workplace.  Northfield Press. 
Gary Chapman, Paul White & Harold Myra (2014). "Rising Above a Toxic Workplace".  Northfield Press. 
Gary Chapman, Paul White & Harold Myra (2014). "Sync or Swim".  Northfield Press.

References

Gary Chapman, Jennifer Thomas (2006).  The Five Languages of Apology.  Moody.  
Gary Chapman (2007).  Now You're Speaking My Language.  B&H.

External links
 

1938 births
Living people
20th-century American male writers
20th-century Baptists
21st-century American male writers
21st-century Baptists
American family and parenting writers
American talk radio hosts
Baptists from North Carolina
Baptist writers
Moody Bible Institute alumni
People from China Grove, North Carolina
Relationship education
Wake Forest University alumni
Writers from Winston-Salem, North Carolina
Wheaton College (Illinois) alumni